Lecoma is an unincorporated community in northwestern Dent County, Missouri, United States. It is located approximately twelve miles south of Rolla.

A post office called Lecoma was established in 1883, and remained in operation until 1990. The community's name is an amalgamation of the surnames of local merchants Lenox, Comstock, and Martin.

References

Unincorporated communities in Dent County, Missouri
Unincorporated communities in Missouri